Fabrice Abriel (born 6 July 1979) is a French former professional footballer who played as a midfielder. He played for Paris Saint-Germain, Servette, Amiens, Guingamp, Lorient, Marseille, Nice, and Valenciennes.

Abriel retired from football in 2015 and became a consultant for the French TV station Canal+.

Honours
Marseille
Ligue 1: 2009–10
Coupe de la Ligue: 2009–10, 2010–11
Trophée des Champions: 2010

References

External links

1979 births
Living people
Sportspeople from Suresnes
French footballers
Footballers from Réunion
Association football midfielders
Paris Saint-Germain F.C. players
Servette FC players
Amiens SC players
En Avant Guingamp players
FC Lorient players
Olympique de Marseille players
OGC Nice players
Ligue 1 players
Ligue 2 players
Swiss Super League players
Footballers from Hauts-de-Seine